Bijarkan (also Romanized as Bījārkan) is a village in Khoshabar Rural District, in the Central District of Rezvanshahr County, Gilan Province, Iran. At the 2006 census, its population was 184, in 44 families.

References 

Populated places in Rezvanshahr County